Konstantin Dubrovin (born January 4, 1977 in Kyiv, in the Ukrainian SSR of the Soviet Union) is a former freestyle swimmer, who represented Germany at the 1996 Summer Olympics in Atlanta, Georgia. There he swam in the preliminary heats of the Men's 4x200m Freestyle Relay, which eventually won the bronze medal in the final.

References
 profile

1977 births
Living people
German male swimmers
Ukrainian male swimmers
Olympic swimmers of Germany
Swimmers at the 1996 Summer Olympics
Olympic bronze medalists for Germany
Sportspeople from Kyiv
Olympic bronze medalists in swimming
German male freestyle swimmers
Medalists at the 1996 Summer Olympics